New Outlook is the debut album by jazz pianist and mathematician Rob Schneiderman which was recorded on January 5, 1988, and released by Reservoir.

Reception 

The album received a three-star rating by AllMusic

Track listing 
All compositions by Rob Schneiderman except where noted
 "New Outlook" – 9:22
 "Time Waits" (Bud Powell) - 5:10
 "Slippin' and Slidin" - 5:24
 "Cedar" - 4:00
 "While We're Young" (Alec Wilder) - 8:53
 "I've Got You Under My Skin" (Cole Porter) - 5:15
 "Hidden Dreams" - 3:53
 "Here Today" - 6:14

Personnel 
 Rob Schneiderman – piano
 Slide Hampton – trombone
 Rufus Reid – bass
 Akira Tana – drums

References 

Rob Schneiderman albums
1988 debut albums
Reservoir Records albums
Albums recorded at Van Gelder Studio